Martin Huba (born 16 July 1943 in Bratislava) is a Slovak actor and director on stage and in film. 

In 1964 he graduated from the Academy of Performing Arts in Bratislava (VŠMU). He joined the Východoslovenské štátne divadlo (Košice State Theater) in Košice. In 1967 he moved to the theater Divadlo na Korze in Bratislava, where he remained till its closure in 1971. Since 1976 he has been a member of the Slovak National Theatre (SND).

Selected stage performances - actor 
 1995: Isidoro in Čertice by Carlo Goldoni
 1998: Bruscon in Der Theatermacher by Thomas Bernhard, Divadlo Na Zábradlí in Prague (received Alfréd Radok Award)
 2004: Cyrano in Cyrano de Bergerac, SND
 2005: Johannes Rosmer in Rosmersholm, Mahenovo divadlo Brno (nominated for Alfréd Radok Award)

Selected stage performances - director 
 1995: Anton Pavlovich Chekhov: The Cherry Orchard; SND
 1999: Agatha Christie: Desať malých černoškov alebo ...napokon už nezostal nik; Činohra SND
 2001: Tančiareň; SND (received Dosky Award)
 2002: William Shakespeare: King Lear; Summer Shakespeare festival at Prague Castle
 2002: Ronald Harwood: The Dresser; Divadlo v Dlouhé in Prague
 2004: William Shakespeare: Romeo and Juliet; Summer Shakespeare Festival at Prague Castle
 2004: Juraj Beneš: The Players; SND
 2006: Wolfgang Amadeus Mozart: The Marriage of Figaro; SND

External links 
 

1943 births
Living people
Film people from Bratislava
Slovak male film actors
Slovak male stage actors
Slovak theatre directors
Recipients of Medal of Merit (Czech Republic)
Sun in a Net Awards winners
Czech Lion Awards winners
Academy of Performing Arts in Bratislava alumni